Lawrence G. "Larry" Estes (born December 9, 1946) is a former American football defensive end in the National Football League. Estes was born in from Louisville, Mississippi, where he attended Louisville High School. One of few NAIA players to have been drafted by the NFL, Estes was the Saints 8th pick in the 1970 draft.

References

1946 births
Players of American football from Mississippi
American football defensive ends
People from Winston County, Mississippi
Alcorn State Braves football players
New Orleans Saints players
Philadelphia Eagles players
Kansas City Chiefs players
Living people